Aare Pilv (born 15 April 1976) is an Estonian poet, literary scholar, translator and critician.

Pilv as born in Viljandi. He is working as a researcher at Under and Tuglas Literature Centre of the Estonian Academy of Sciences.

He is a member of the poetry group Erakkond ('The Group of Hermits'). He is also a member of Estonian Writers' Union and student society Veljesto.

Works
 1996: poetry collection "Üle"
 1998: poetry collection "Päike ehk päike" ('Sun or Sun')
 1999: poetry collection "Tema nimi on kohus" ('Their Name is Duty')
 2002: poetry collection "Nägemist" ('Goodbye')
 2007. "Näoline" (poetry and prose)
 2010: travelogue "Ramadaan"
 2017: poetry collection "Kui vihm saab läbi" ('When the Rain is Over')

References

Living people
1976 births
Estonian male poets
21st-century Estonian poets
Estonian literary scholars
University of Tartu alumni
People from Viljandi